Rebecca Curtis (born January 10, 1974) is an American writer. She is the author of Twenty Grand and Other Tales of Love & Money (HarperCollins, 2007) and has been published in The New Yorker, Harper's, McSweeney's, NOON, N+1, and other magazines.

Curtis received her bachelor's degree from Pomona College in Claremont, California. She also holds an MFA from Syracuse University and a Master's in English from New York University. In 2005, she received a Rona Jaffe Foundation Writers Award for emerging female writers, and won the Rona Jaffe Foundation Writers' Award for fiction.

Curtis is a lecturer in Columbia University's Writing Program and is a contributor to Columbia: A Journal of Literature and Art.

List of works

Books
 Twenty Grand (2007)
 "Hungry Self" (originally published in The New Yorker, 2001)
 "Summer, with Twins" (originally published in Harper's, 2005)
 "To the Interstate" (originally published in Conjunctions, 2005)
 "The Alpine Slide" (originally published in The New Yorker, 2004)
 "The Near-Son" (originally published in n+1, 2007)
 "Big Bear, California" (originally published in Harper's, 2002)
 "Monsters" (originally published in Crowd)
 "Knick, Knack, Paddywhack" (originally published in Fence)
 "Twenty Grand" (originally published in The New Yorker, 2005)
 "The Wolf at the Door" (originally published in StoryQuarterly, 2004)
 "Solicitation" (originally published in McSweeney's)
 "The Witches"
 "The Sno-Kone Cart" (originally published in McSweeney's, 2005)

Uncollected stories
 "The Deep Red Cremation of Isaac and Grace" (The Antioch Review, 2002)
 "Someone Like Sue" (NOON, 2006)
 "The Contradiction" (Columbia, 2007)
 "The White Fox" (Columbia, 2007)
 "My Race Speech" (Esquire, 2008)
 "The Gusher" (McSweeney's, 2013)
 "Fish Rot" (n+1, 2013)
 "The Christmas Miracle" (The New Yorker, 2013)
 "The Toast" (Harper's, 2014)
 "The Pink House" (The New Yorker, 2014)
 "The Magic Thyroid and Energy Boosting Chocolate Truffles" (n+1, 2014)
 "Waterloo!" (McSweeney's, 2014)
 "Hansa and Gretyl and Piece of Shit" (The New Yorker, 2020)
 "Satellites" (The New Yorker, 2021)

References

External links
 2013 interview in n+1
 2019 interview on the Dan & Eric Read The New Yorker So You Don’t Have To podcast

American women short story writers
Pomona College alumni
Syracuse University alumni
New York University alumni
The New Yorker people
Columbia University faculty
1976 births
Living people
21st-century American women writers
Rona Jaffe Foundation Writers' Award winners
21st-century American short story writers
American women academics